Gabriele Tinti (born 18 December 1979 in Jesi, Italy) is an Italian poet and writer.

Career
Gabriele Tinti has worked with the J. Paul Getty Museum, the Metropolitan Museum of Art, the British Museum, the Los Angeles County Museum of Art, the National Roman Museum, the Capitoline Museums, The Ara Pacis, the National Archaeological Museum, Naples and the Glyptothek of Munich composing poems for ancient works of art including the Boxer at Rest, the Discobolus, Arundel Head, the Ludovisi Gaul, the Victorious Youth, the Farnese Hercules, the Hercules by Scopas, the Elgin Marbles from the Parthenon, the Barberini Faun, the Doryphoros and many other masterpieces.

His works have been the object of readings and performances in front of the works of art that inspired them.

2014 marked his first work with Franco Nero, who then several times read Tinti's poems inspired by the collections in the National Roman Museum  and the Capitoline Museums.

In 2015 Robert Davi read Tinti's poem the Boxer at Rest at the J. Paul Getty Museum in Los Angeles, and in subsequent years at the Los Angeles County Museum of Art, again at the J. Paul Getty Museum and in a series of videos for the Treccani, Italian Encyclopaedia of Science, Letters, and Arts.

In 2016 the actor Joe Mantegna read some poems inspired by the figure of Heracles at the Los Angeles County Museum of Art.

From 2016 to 2018 he composed some poems inspired by Giorgio de Chirico’s masterpieces with mythological subjects. His works have been read at the Metropolitan Museum of Art and the Peggy Guggenheim Collection by the actor Burt Young, at the Museum of Modern Art in New York by the actor Vincent Piazza and at the Museo del Novecento in Milan by Alessandro Haber.

In 2018 his ekphrastic poetry project ‘Ruins’ was awarded the Premio Montale  with a ceremony at the National Roman Museum in Palazzo Altemps.

In the same year he extended his poetic work inspired by masterpieces of art to Renaissance painting, with a reading at the Pinacoteca di Brera and the Galleria di Palazzo Spinola, working again with the actor Alessandro Haber.

In 2019 he was involved in a series of readings at the Capitoline Museums, the National Roman Museum, the J. Paul Getty Museum and the Los Angeles County Museum of Art in Los Angeles  with Marton Csokas, Robert Davi and Jamie McShane.

In February 2020 he returned to the British Museum for a reading inspired by the Trojan heroes on the occasion of the “Troy Myth and Reality” exhibition.

On World Poetry Day, 21 March 2020, the National Roman Museum presented the first poetic audio guide for the museum written by Tinti with readings by Marton Csokas, Alessandro Haber, Franco Nero and Kevin Spacey.

Collaborations 
His poems have been performed by actors like Joe Mantegna, Michael Imperioli, Burt Young, Alessandro Haber, Robert Davi, Vincent Piazza, Marton Csokas and Franco Nero.

In 2019 he worked with the two time Oscar winner Kevin Spacey. After having returned to the stage with the video ‘Let me be Frank’, which attracted millions of views, on 2 August Spacey read four of Tinti's poems inspired by the Boxer at Rest in front of a large crowd that gathered at the National Roman Museum in Palazzo Massimo, where the statue is located. The official video was released the next day on Tinti's YouTube channel.

During the COVID-19 pandemic, in association with the Capitoline Museums, the National Roman Museum and the Ministry of Cultural Heritage and Activities (Italy), he launched a series of virtual events inspired by epigraphs collected in the museums working with Malcolm McDowell, Marton Csokas, Robert Davi and Franco Nero.

When the National Roman Museum reopened after the COVID-19 pandemic Tinti worked with Abel Ferrara, who read his dramatic works inspired by the Ludovisi Gaul, a Roman marble group depicting a Gallic man in the act of plunging a sword into his breast.

Writing 
His work focuses on the subject of death and suffering and is mainly composed in the form of lucid and epigrammatic poetry. The humanity sung in his writings is the dramatic life of boxers, suicides, defeated heroes and the disabled.

In 2016 he published Last words (Skira Rizzoli) a collection of found poetry in association with Andres Serrano.

His work has been inspired by the Greek lyric poets Archilochus and Theocritus, the Romantics Percy Bysshe Shelley and John Keats and the Russian poets Sergei Yesenin and Alexander Alexandrovich Blok.

Controversy

In an interview in The Washington Post, regarding his work with Kevin Spacey, he said that: “I have always taken the side of the scapegoat (…) I believe that Me Too movement is becoming a violent witch hunt. Spacey, like others, has the right to the presumption of innocence and I cannot in any way support the preventative exclusion and annihilation of a man, woman or work,”.

His work with Abel Ferrara took place at a time when sculptures were being pulled down all over the world. After the performance Tinti said to la Repubblica: “Sculptures have a voice to be responded to or embodied, but through poetry, not violence”.

List of works

Books
  (Poetry)
  (Poetry)
  (Poetry)
  (Poetry)
   (Essays)
  (Poetry)
   (Essays)

Videos 
 2020 Boxer at Rest, Ministry of Cultural Heritage and Activities (Italy), with Franco Nero.
 2020 Songs of stone, Ministry of Cultural Heritage and Activities (Italy), with Franco Nero  
 2019 Riace bronzes, Treccani with Robert Davi
 2019 Polyhymnia, Treccani, with Marton Csokas
 2019 Anacreon, Treccani, with Marton Csokas
 2019 Theseus, Treccani, with Marton Csokas
 2019 Icarus, Treccani, with Marton Csokas
 2019 The boxer, National Roman Museum, with Kevin Spacey
 2019 Il Cantore, Rai, with Alessandro Haber
 2019 Doryphorus, Treccani, with Robert Davi
 2019 Apollo, Treccani with Robert Davi
 2019 Hercules, Treccani, with Robert Davi
 2019 Hesiod, Treccani, with Robert Davi
 2019 Hermes, Treccani, Los Angeles County Museum of Art, with Robert Davi
 2019 Tyrannicides, Treccani, with Robert Davi
 2019 The Battle of Alexander, Treccani, with Robert Davi
 2019 Runners Treccani, with Robert Davi
 2018 Apollo, Rai, with Alessandro Haber
 2018 The boxer, Rai, with Alessandro Haber
 2017 The poet, Rai, with Alessandro Haber
 2017 Ruins, Rai, with Alessandro Haber
 2016 Hercules, Los Angeles County Museum of Art with Joe Mantegna
 2016 The nostalgia of the poet, Rai, with Alessandro Haber
 2016 Idols, masks, Glyptotheque with Hans Kremer
 2015 The boxer– Part II, J. Paul Getty Museum, with Robert Davi
 2015 The boxer – Part I, J. Paul Getty Museum, with Robert Davi

See also
Andres Serrano
Kevin Spacey
Abel Ferrara
Found poetry
Ekphrasis
Lyric Poetry

References

External links

 
 
Kevin Spacey reads The Boxer by Gabriele Tinti at the National Roman Museum
Joe Mantegna reads Hercules by Gabriele Tinti at the Los Angeles County Museum of Art

Italian male poets
1979 births
Living people
21st-century Italian poets
21st-century Italian writers
21st-century Italian male writers
Elgin Marbles